Carl Rakosi (November 6, 1903 – June 25, 2004) was the last surviving member of the original group of poets who were given the rubric Objectivist. He was still publishing and performing his poetry well into his 90s.

Early life

Rakosi was born in Berlin and lived there and in Hungary until 1910, when he moved to the United States to live with his father and stepmother. His father was a jeweler and watchmaker in Chicago and later in Gary, Indiana. The family lived in semi-poverty but contrived to send him to the University of Chicago and then to the University of Wisconsin–Madison. During his time studying at the university level, he started writing poetry. On graduating, he worked for a time as a social worker, then returned to college to study psychology. At this time, he changed his name to Callman Rawley because he felt he stood a better chance of being employed if he had a more American-sounding name. After a spell as a psychologist and teacher, he returned to social work for the rest of his working life.

Early writings

At the University of Wisconsin–Madison, Rakosi edited the Wisconsin Literary Magazine. His own poetry at this stage was influenced by W. B. Yeats, Wallace Stevens, and E. E. Cummings. He also started reading William Carlos Williams and T. S. Eliot. By 1925, he was publishing poems in The Little Review and Nation.

Pound and the Objectivists

By the late 1920s, Rakosi was in correspondence with Ezra Pound, who prompted Louis Zukofsky to contact him. This led to Rakosi's inclusion in the Objectivist issue of Poetry and in the Objectivist Anthology. Rakosi himself had reservations about the Objectivist tag, feeling that the poets involved were too different from each other to form a group in any meaningful sense of the word. He did, however, especially admire the work of Charles Reznikoff.

Later career

Like a number of his fellow Objectivists, Rakosi abandoned poetry in the 1940s. After his 1941 Selected Poems he dedicated himself to social work and apparently neither read nor wrote poetry. Years earlier, shortly after his twenty-first birthday, Rakosi had legally changed his name to Callman Rawley, believing that he would not find work with his foreign-sounding name.  Under his adopted name, he served as head of the Minneapolis Jewish Children's and Family Service from 1945 until his retirement in 1968. A letter from the English poet Andrew Crozier about his early poetry was the trigger that started Rakosi writing again. His first book in 26 years, Amulet, was published by New Directions in 1967 and his Collected Poems in 1986 by the National Poetry Foundation. These were followed by several more volumes and by readings across the United States and Europe.

In early November 2003, Rakosi celebrated his 100th birthday with friends at the San Francisco Public Library. Upon his death Jacket Magazine editor John Tranter observed the following:

External links
Rakosi at Modern American Poetry
The Carl Rakosi Papers in the Mandeville Special Collections Library at UC San Diego
Carl Rakosi Reading and Interview on KPFA's Ode To Gravity, 13 May 1971 (from The Internet Archive)  	
Obituary in The Guardian, UK
Carl Rakosi feature at Jacket Magazine includes Rakosi in conversation with Tom Devaney & Olivier Brossard; link to audio recordings at University of Pennsylvania, and poems, dedications & remembrances from Jane Augustine, Robert Creeley, Laurie Duggan, Michael Heller and Kent Johnson
 "Add-Verse" a poetry-photo-video project Rakosi participated in

1903 births
2004 deaths
Objectivist poets
American centenarians
American male poets
20th-century American poets
20th-century American male writers
Men centenarians